A single point of failure (SPOF) is a part of a system that, if it fails, will stop the entire system from working. SPOFs are undesirable in any system with a goal of high availability or reliability, be it a business practice, software application, or other industrial system.

Overview
Systems can be made robust by adding redundancy in all potential SPOFs. Redundancy can be achieved at various levels. 

The assessment of a potential SPOF involves identifying the critical components of a complex system that would provoke a total systems failure in case of malfunction. Highly reliable systems should not rely on any such individual component.

For instance, the owner of a small tree care company may only own one woodchipper. If the chipper breaks, he may be unable to complete his current job and may have to cancel future jobs until he can obtain a replacement. The owner of the tree care company may have spare parts ready for the repair of the wood chipper, in case it fails. At a higher level, he may have a second wood chipper that he can bring to the job site. Finally, at the highest level, he may have enough equipment available to completely replace everything at the work site in the case of multiple failures.

Computing

A fault-tolerant computer system can be achieved at the internal component level, at the system level (multiple machines), or site level (replication).

One would normally deploy a load balancer to ensure high availability for a server cluster at the system level. In a high-availability server cluster, each individual server may attain internal component redundancy by having multiple power supplies, hard drives, and other components. System-level redundancy could be obtained by having spare servers waiting to take on the work of another server if it fails.

Since a data center is often a support center for other operations such as business logic, it represents a potential SPOF in itself. Thus, at the site level, the entire cluster may be replicated at another location, where it can be accessed in case the primary location becomes unavailable. This is typically addressed as part of an IT disaster recovery (resiliency) program.

Paul Baran and Donald Davies developed packet switching, a key part of "survivable communications networks". Such networks including ARPANET and the Internet are designed to have no single point of failure. Multiple paths between any two points on the network allow those points to continue communicating with each other, the packets "routing around" damage, even after any single failure of any one particular path or any one intermediate node.

Software engineering 
In software engineering, a bottleneck occurs when the capacity of an application or a computer system is limited by a single component. The bottleneck has lowest throughput of all parts of the transaction path.

Performance engineering 
Tracking down bottlenecks (sometimes known as hot spots – sections of the code that execute most frequently – i.e., have the highest execution count) is called performance analysis. Reduction is usually achieved with the help of specialized tools, known as performance analyzers or profilers. The objective is to make those particular sections of code perform as fast as possible to improve overall algorithmic efficiency.

Computer security 
A vulnerability or security exploit in just one component can compromise an entire system.

Other fields
The concept of a single point of failure has also been applied to fields outside of engineering, computers, and networking, such as corporate supply chain management and transportation management.

Design structures that create single points of failure include bottlenecks and series circuits (in contrast to parallel circuits).

In transportation, some noted recent examples of the concept's recent application have included the Nipigon River Bridge in Canada, where a partial bridge failure in January 2016 entirely severed road traffic between Eastern Canada and Western Canada for several days because it is located along a portion of the Trans-Canada Highway where there is no alternate detour route for vehicles to take; and the Norwalk River Railroad Bridge in Norwalk, Connecticut, an aging swing bridge that sometimes gets stuck when opening or closing, disrupting rail traffic on the Northeast Corridor line.

The concept of a single point of failure has also been applied to the fields of intelligence. Edward Snowden talked of the dangers of being what he described as "the single point of failure" – the sole repository of information.

Life-support systems

A component of a life-support system that would constitute a single point of failure would be required to be extremely reliable.

See also

Concepts

Applications

In literature

References

Engineering failures
Systems engineering
Reliability engineering
Fault-tolerant computer systems
Network architecture